This is a list of diplomatic missions of the Republic of Cuba, excluding honorary consulates. Cuba has an extensive global diplomatic presence and is the Latin American country with the second highest number of diplomatic missions after Brazil.

Current missions

Africa

Americas

Asia

Europe

Oceania

Multilateral organizations

Gallery

Closed missions

Africa

Americas

Asia

Europe

Oceania

See also

 Foreign relations of Cuba
 List of diplomatic missions in Cuba
 Visa policy of Cuba

Explanatory notes

References

External links
Cuban Ministry of Foreign Affairs

 
Diplomatic missions
Cuban